The thirty-fifth season of Saturday Night Live (also branded SNL 35), an American sketch comedy series, originally aired in the United States on NBC between September 26, 2009, and May 15, 2010.

A total of 22 episodes were broadcast during the show's eight-month-long season, which included a two-week break in February due to the 2010 Winter Olympics. The season was accompanied by three prime-time episodes of Saturday Night Live Weekend Update Thursday and three prime-time SNL clip shows.

A notable moment of the season was when an internet campaign was created to get actress Betty White to host an episode of the show. The campaign was started in early 2010 on Facebook and the group was called "Betty White to Host SNL (please?)!" The campaign was successful, and White became the oldest person ever to host the show. For White's episode, Lorne Michaels brought back former cast members Rachel Dratch, Tina Fey, Ana Gasteyer, Amy Poehler, Maya Rudolph and Molly Shannon. The episode garnered the show's highest ratings in over a year. with a rating of 5.8 in the 18–49 rating, demographic and with 12.1 million viewers overall.

Cast
Before the start of the season, Darrell Hammond, who was the last cast member from the 1990s, left the show. At the time, Hammond became the longest-running cast member with a total of 14 seasons, though he would later be surpassed by Kenan Thompson in 2017. Following Hammond's departure, featured players Michaela Watkins and Casey Wilson were both let go from the show before the start of the season. Wilson had been on the show for two seasons, while Watkins had been on for only one. To account for the absences of Watkins and Wilson, the show brought in two new featured players, comedian and writer Nasim Pedrad of The Groundlings and stand-up comic Jenny Slate. Abby Elliott and Bobby Moynihan remained as featured players.

This would be the last season for longtime cast member Will Forte, who had been with the cast for 8 seasons since 2002. This would also be the only season for featured player Jenny Slate, who was let go at the end of the season.

Cast roster

Repertory players
Fred Armisen
Will Forte
Bill Hader
Seth Meyers
Andy Samberg
Jason Sudeikis
Kenan Thompson
Kristen Wiig

Featured players
Abby Elliott
Bobby Moynihan
Nasim Pedrad
Jenny Slate

bold denotes Weekend Update anchor

Writers

Second City theater performer Mike O'Brien joins the writing staff. He would join the cast for the show's thirty-ninth season. Season 35 would prove to be the final season with Lonely Island member Jorma Taccone as a credited writer. He would make contributions to select Lonely Island sketches.

Episodes

<onlyinclude>{{#invoke:Episode table|main
|background=#A11B5C
|overall= 
|season=
|aux1=
|aux1T=Host
|aux2=33
|aux2T=Musical guest
|airdate=
|viewers=
|viewersT=Ratings/Share
|episodes=

{{#invoke:Episode list|sublist|Saturday Night Live (season 35)
|EpisodeNumber=679
|EpisodeNumber2=21
|RTitle=Betty White
|Aux1=Jay-Z
|OriginalAirDate= 
|Viewers=8.8/21
|ShortSummary=
In early 2010, an online campaign was created on Facebook to get White to host an episode of the show. The group was called Betty White to Host SNL (please?)! The movement was sparked by White's appearance in a Snickers commercial aired during Super Bowl XLIV. Because of this, White is the first person to ever host based on an internet movement created by fans. The commercial itself aired during one of the commercial breaks.
With this episode, White, at age 88, is the oldest person ever to host the show, surpassing Miskel Spillman, the winner of SNL'''s "Anyone Can Host" contest in 1977.
For the first set, Jay-Z performs a medley of "Public Service Announcement", "On to the Next One", "99 Problems", "'03 Bonnie and Clyde", and "Empire State of Mind," featuring back-up singer Bridget Kelly. During "99 Problems", Jay-Z's band samples "Points of Authority" by Linkin Park. For the second set, Jay-Z performs "Young Forever" with Mr Hudson, which he dedicated to White.
Former SNL cast members Rachel Dratch, Tina Fey, Ana Gasteyer, Amy Poehler, Maya Rudolph and Molly Shannon appear throughout the show. Gasteyer and Shannon reprised their characters from The Delicious Dish sketches. Shannon also reprised her character Sally O'Malley during Weekend Update. Rudolph reprised her impression of Whitney Houston during Weekend Update. Fey and Poehler returned to Update as well, to participate in Really!?!.
This episode was nominated for seven 2010 Emmy Awards.
White won an Emmy for Guest Actress in a Comedy for hosting.
This episode was re-aired on January 1, 2022 in place of the re-airing of the Season 47 episode with Kieran Culkin and Ed Sheeran as a tribute to White, as she died the previous day on December 31, 2021.
TV Ratings: 14.952 million viewers 
|LineColor=A11B5C
}}

}}</onlyinclude>

Specials
{{#invoke:Episode table|main
|background=#A11B5C
|title=
|airdate=
|episodes=

{{#invoke:Episode list|sublist|Saturday Night Live (season 35)
|LineColor=A11B5C
|Title= Saturday Night Live in the 2000s: Time and Again
|OriginalAirDate = 
|ShortSummary= The special featured insight on the show during the 2000s: topics discussed include Jimmy Fallon and Tina Fey as the new Weekend Update anchors after the departure of Colin Quinn, how SNL became popular for its spoofs on the 2000 United States presidential election, how the show's humor survived the 9/11 attacks and the anthrax scare, Will Ferrell's departure at the end of season 27 and the search for a replacement cast member to play George W. Bush, SNL's shaky years between seasons 28 and 30 due to Jimmy Fallon's and Horatio Sanz's cracking up on camera, Jimmy Fallon's departure from the show, Amy Poehler teaming up with Tina Fey for Weekend Update, the hiring of Bill Hader, Andy Samberg, and Kristen Wiig, and SNL regaining its popularity with the Digital Shorts, its return from the WGA strike of 2007–2008, the introduction of new fan-favorite hosts like Justin Timberlake and Jon Hamm, and the 2008 U.S. Presidential Election.

Fred Armisen, Alec Baldwin, Rachel Dratch, Abby Elliott, Jimmy Fallon, Will Ferrell, Tina Fey, Will Forte, Bill Hader, Darrell Hammond, Chris Kattan, Marci Klein, John McCain, Seth Meyers, Lorne Michaels, Tracy Morgan, Bobby Moynihan, Chris Parnell, Amy Poehler, Maya Rudolph, Andy Samberg, Horatio Sanz, Akiva Schaffer, Molly Shannon, Michael Shoemaker, Jason Sudeikis, Jorma Taccone, Kenan Thompson, Justin Timberlake, Christopher Walken and Kristen Wiig gave insight in the special.
}}
}}

Saturday Night Live Weekend Update Thursday

The second season of Saturday Night Live Weekend Update Thursday, a limited-run series based on Saturday Night Live's "Weekend Update" sketch, aired in conjunction with this season. The show is hosted by Seth Meyers, Update's current host, and former Update co-host Amy Poehler. Like the sketch, the show is a parody of local news broadcasts and satirizes contemporary news stories and figures. As of June 2010, three episodes have aired. An additional three episodes were scheduled to air in spring 2010, but were scrapped.

MacGruber film
The first SNL film since 2000's The Ladies Man, MacGruber was released on May 21, 2010. The film, starring SNL cast members Will Forte and Kristen Wiig and former cast member Maya Rudolph, is based on the "MacGruber" sketches from the show. It received mixed reviews from critics and, in spite of a wide initial release, was a box office bomb. After a two-week opening commitment during which it was shown in 2,546 theaters, it was dropped from all but 177 theaters starting in its third week, a drop exceeded since 1982 only by Meet Dave and The Rocker''.

References

35
Saturday Night Live in the 2000s
Saturday Night Live in the 2010s
2009 American television seasons
2010 American television seasons
Television shows directed by Don Roy King